Lann is an Irish language female given name.

Bearers of the name

 Lann ingen Dúnlainge, Princess of Osraighe and Queen of Midhe, died 866.
 Lann ingen Donnchadha, Princess of Ailech, died 940.
 Lann ui Selbachan, Abbess of Kildare, died 1047.
 Lann Perry, Princess of Maxime. died 1257.

See also
List of Irish-language given names
Vanessa Lann

External links
 http://medievalscotland.org/kmo/AnnalsIndex/Feminine/Lann.shtml

Irish-language feminine given names